Last Days of the Victim is a 1982 Argentine crime thriller film directed by Adolfo Aristarain and starring Federico Luppi. It was written by Aristarain and José Pablo Feinmann, and based on Feinmann's classic novel of the same name. The film was selected as the Argentine entry for the Best Foreign Language Film at the 55th Academy Awards, but was not accepted as a nominee.

In a survey of the 100 greatest films of Argentine cinema carried out by the Museo del Cine Pablo Ducrós Hicken in 2000, the film reached the 23rd position. In a new version of the survey organized in 2022 by the specialized magazines La vida útil, Taipei and La tierra quema, presented at the Mar del Plata International Film Festival, the film reached the 36th position.

Plot
Mendizábal, a professional hitman, is ordered by his anonymous client to spy and murder a wealthy man. But while in his precise and obsessive pursuit, Mendizábal slowly realizes he is being part of a mysterious game of cat and mouse, which itself is tied to a chain of many personal interests.

Cast
 Federico Luppi as Raúl Mendizábal
 Soledad Silveyra as Cecilia Ravenna
 Ulises Dumont as "El Gato" (The Cat) Funes
 Julio De Grazia as Carlos Ravenna
 Arturo Maly as Rodolfo Külpe
 Elena Tasisto as Laura Ramos de Külpe
 Enrique Liporace as Peña
 China Zorrilla as Beba (Landlady)
 Mónica Galán as Vienna
 Carlos Ferreiro as Ferrari

See also
 List of submissions to the 55th Academy Awards for Best Foreign Language Film
 List of Argentine submissions for the Academy Award for Best Foreign Language Film

References

External links
 

1982 films
1980s crime thriller films
Argentine crime thriller films
1980s Spanish-language films
1980s Argentine films